Glycoinformatics is a field of bioinformatics that pertains to the study of carbohydrates involved in protein post-translational modification. It broadly includes (but is not restricted to) database, software, and algorithm development for the study of carbohydrate structures, glycoconjugates, enzymatic carbohydrate synthesis and degradation, as well as carbohydrate interactions. Conventional usage of the term does not currently include the treatment of carbohydrates from the better-known nutritive aspect.

Issues to consider

Even though glycosylation is the most common form of protein modification, with highly complex carbohydrate structures, the bioinformatics on glycome is still very poor.

Unlike proteins and nucleic acids which are linear, carbohydrates are often branched and extremely complex. For instance, just four sugars can be strung together to form more than 5 million different types of carbohydrates or nine different sugars may be assembled into 15 million possible four-sugar-chains.

Also, the number of simple sugars that make up glycans is more than the number of nucleotides that make up DNA or RNA. Therefore, it is more computationally expensive to evaluate their structures.

One of the main constrains in the glycoinformatics is the difficulty of representing sugars in the sequence form especially due to their branching nature. Owing to the lack of a genetic blue print, carbohydrates do not have a "fixed" sequence. Instead, the sequence is largely determined by the presence of a variety of enzymes, their kinetic differences and variations in the biosynthetic micro-environment of the cells. This increases the complexity of analysis and experimental reproducibility of the carbohydrate structure of interest. It is for this reason that carbohydrates are often considered as the "information poor" molecules.

Databases
 Table of major glyco-databases.

References

Bioinformatics
Carbohydrate chemistry
Glycomics